Ernst Johansson (11 March 1876 – 26 August 1936) was a Swedish sports shooter. He competed in the 50m rifle event at the 1912 Summer Olympics.

References

External links
 

1876 births
1936 deaths
People from Olofström Municipality
Swedish male sport shooters
Olympic shooters of Sweden
Shooters at the 1912 Summer Olympics
Sportspeople from Blekinge County